Joe Zewe (born June 22, 1983 in McKeesport, Pennsylvania) is an American soccer player, currently without a club.

Career

Youth
Zewe grew up in the suburbs of Pittsburgh where he played for Pittsburgh Beadling.  He also played collegiately for Penn State.

Professional
Zewe began his professional career in 2005 with B 1909 of the Danish 2nd Division. He left the team in May 2006, with three games remaining in the season, having scored 12 goals in all competitions.

In July 2006, Zewe signed a contract with Viborg FF of the Danish Superliga, and played for the team for 2 years before returning to the United States in 2008. Zewe played several games for his hometown Pittsburgh Riverhounds in the USL Second Division in 2008, but left due to mutual consent and in July 2008, and subsequently signed a contract with KÍ Klaksvík of the Faroe Islands Premier League Football.

Zewe returned to Pittsburgh in 2009.

References

External links
Riverhounds bio

1983 births
Living people
American soccer players
Soccer players from Pennsylvania
Penn State Nittany Lions men's soccer players
American expatriate soccer players
Association football forwards
Reading United A.C. players
Viborg FF players
Pittsburgh Beadling players
Pittsburgh Riverhounds SC players
USL League Two players
USL Second Division players